Alan Barnard Cleveley (born 5 January 1932 – 17 September 2012) is a former English cricketer. Cleveley was a right-handed batsman who bowled right-arm fast-medium. He was born at Chaddesden, Derbyshire.

Cleveley made a single first-class appearance for Nottinghamshire against Essex at Trent Bridge in the 1955 County Championship. Essex won the toss and elected to bat first, making 264 all out, during which Cleveley bowled 17 wicketless overs which conceded 44 runs. Nottinghamshire then made 320 all out in their first-innings, with Cleveley ending the innings not out on 4 runs. He took the wickets of Paul Gibb, Trevor Bailey and Ray Smith in Essex's second-innings of 270/8 declared, finishing with figures of 3/63 from 21 overs. Requiring 215 for victory, Nottinghamshire were dismissed for just 119, with Cleveley being dismissed for a duck by Dickie Dodds, with Essex winning by 95 runs. This was his only first-class appearance.

References

External links
Alan Cleveley at ESPNcricinfo
Alan Cleveley at CricketArchive

1932 births
2012 deaths
Cricketers from Derby
English cricketers
Nottinghamshire cricketers
People from Chaddesden